Franciscus Pieter van Wieringen (28 March 1903 – 1997) was a Dutch fencer. He competed in the individual and team sabre events at the 1936 Summer Olympics.

References

External links
 

1903 births
1997 deaths
Dutch male sabre fencers
Olympic fencers of the Netherlands
Fencers at the 1936 Summer Olympics
Sportspeople from Rotterdam
20th-century Dutch people